AmbaSSada (Embassy) is a 2013 Polish fantasy-comedy film involving time travel.

Plot 
A young couple, Melania and Przemek, house-sit in a house which in the inter-war period had been the site of the German embassy.

Cast 
 Magdalena Grąziowska – Melania
 Bartosz Porczyk – Przemek, husband of Melania / Anton, grandfather of Przemek
 Ksawery Szlenkier – Otto
 Aleksandra Domańska – Ingeborg
 Robert Więckiewicz – Adolf Hitler
 Jan Englert – Oskar
 Anna Romantowska
 Adam Darski – Joachim von Ribbentrop
 Krystian Wieczorek – Ende
 Szymon Piotr Warszawski – Hans
 Robert Jarociński – Julek
 Anna Terpiłowska – Ola

References 

Films directed by Juliusz Machulski
Films about time travel
Cultural depictions of Adolf Hitler
Polish comedy films

2013 films
2010s Polish-language films